The 2010 California Attorney General election was held on November 2, 2010, to choose the Attorney General of California. The primary election was held on June 8, 2010. Incumbent Attorney General Jerry Brown, a Democrat, was elected Governor of California.

The two major candidates were district attorneys from Los Angeles County and San Francisco, Republican Steve Cooley and Democrat Kamala Harris respectively. On November 24, 2010, Cooley conceded to Harris, giving the Democrats a sweep of statewide executive offices. On November 30, Harris declared victory. Harris was the state's first female attorney general, first African American attorney general (father from Jamaica), and first Asian American (mother from India) state attorney general when her term began in January 2011.

Campaign
For much of the election cycle following the primary election, political analysts theorized early on that the strength of Cooley's name after being twice elected District Attorney in Democratic-Stronghold Los Angeles County, being viewed as a rising star in the California Republican Party along with the strength of Meg Whitman's well-funded campaign anchoring the California Republican ticket in 2010 made Steve Cooley the initial favorite by a slight margin to win the election. 

Kamala Harris coalesced Democratic support with her opposition to Proposition 8, which Cooley promised to defend in court, opposing the unpopular Proposition 23 and any proposal for an SB 1070-style law in California. Harris benefitted from an endorsement and joint appearance with President Barack Obama at a rally at the University of Southern California before election day as well as a focus of the Los Angeles County Democratic Party on promoting her candidacy in Los Angeles County towards the final weeks of the campaign, which promised to make the race competitive.

On election night, the headliners on the Republican ticket, Meg Whitman and Carly Fiorina were soundly defeated by Jerry Brown and Barbara Boxer, with Democrats having a healthy margin to declare victory in every other statewide contest. Abel Maldonado, who was defeated for his reelection bid as Lieutenant Governor, stated that errors of the Whitman and Fiorina campaigns dragged Republican candidates on the bottom of the ticket down along with the fading fortunes of Whitman and Fiorina towards the end of the race.

The only bright spot statewide for the California Republican Party that night were early returns showing Cooley with a lead of up to eight points, in which he and many news organizations declared victory. However, the next morning, returns from Los Angeles County, which was believed to be a Cooley stronghold came in strong for Kamala Harris, removing one of Cooley's key advantages and making the race too close to call. Cooley then canceled a victory press conference scheduled for that day. 

Los Angeles and San Francisco County reported their returns, which favored Harris with less than 38,000 votes (45.9% versus 45.7%)  separating both candidates at the end of counting that day.

On November 24, 2010, Cooley conceded the race when it was determined that he was going to be unable to overcome the 50,000-vote lead that Harris had built up and maintained during the past week, with a majority of the uncounted ballots coming from counties which Harris won. The closest statewide race of the 2010 cycle in California, Cooley was the top vote-getter of the 2010 Republican ticket, while Harris's victory gave the Democratic Party a clean sweep of all of California's statewide offices - a feat the party had last accomplished in 2002.

Democratic primary

Candidates
 Rocky Delgadillo, attorney and former Los Angeles City Attorney who ran in the Democratic primary in 2006
 Kamala Harris, District Attorney of San Francisco
 Chris Kelly, attorney and former chief privacy officer of Facebook
 Ted Lieu, former military prosecutor and assemblymember from the 53rd district
 Pedro Nava, attorney and assemblymember from the 35th district
 Mike Schmier, employee rights attorney
 Alberto Torrico, assemblymember from the 20th district, former Majority Leader of the State Assembly, and workers' rights attorney

Results

Republican primary

Candidates
 Steve Cooley, Los Angeles County District Attorney
 John C. Eastman, constitutional law attorney and former dean of Chapman University School of Law
 Tom Harman, attorney and state senator representing the 35th district

Results

Minor parties

American Independent Party

Results

Green Party
 Peter Allen, attorney, former prosecutor, administrative law judge, and consumer advocate

Results

Libertarian Party
 Timothy Hannan, attorney, mediator and arbitrator

Results

Peace and Freedom Party
 Robert Evans, attorney, activist, former Recording Secretary of the Peace and Freedom Party

Results

General election

Polling

Results

References

External links 
Peter Allen
Steve Cooley
Rocky Delgadillo
John Eastman
Robert Evans
Timothy Hannan
Tom Harman
Kamala Harris
Chris Kelly
Ted Lieu
Pedro Nava
Mike Schmier
Diane Templin
Alberto Torrico

Attorney General election, 2010
2010
California
Kamala Harris